Eze Nri Ọmalọ was the fourth king of Nri Kingdom after succeeding Eze Nri Buífè. He reigned from 1260–1299 CE.

References

Nri-Igbo
Nri monarchs
Kingdom of Nri
13th-century monarchs in Africa